Proverbs 3 is the third chapter of the Book of Proverbs in the Hebrew Bible or the Old Testament of the Christian Bible. The book is a compilation of several wisdom literature collections, with the heading in 1:1 may be intended to regard Solomon as the traditional author of the whole book, but the dates of the individual collections are difficult to determine, and the book probably obtained its final shape in the post-exilic period. This chapter is a part of the first collection of the book.

Text
The original text is written in Hebrew language. This chapter is divided into 35 verses.

Textual witnesses
Some early manuscripts containing the text of this chapter in Hebrew are of the Masoretic Text, which includes the Aleppo Codex (10th century), and Codex Leningradensis (1008).

There is also a translation into Koine Greek known as the Septuagint, made in the last few centuries BC. Extant ancient manuscripts of the Septuagint version include Codex Vaticanus (B; B; 4th century), Codex Sinaiticus (S; BHK: S; 4th century), and Codex Alexandrinus (A; A; 5th century).

Analysis
This chapter belongs to a section regarded as the first collection in the book of Proverbs (comprising Proverbs 1–9), known as "Didactic discourses". The Jerusalem Bible describes chapters 1–9 as a prologue of the chapters 10–22:16, the so-called "[actual] proverbs of Solomon", as "the body of the book". 
The chapter has the following structure:
introductory exhortation (1–4), 
an admonition to be faithful to the Lord (5–12). 
commendation of Wisdom as
 the most valuable possession (13–18), 
essential to creation (19–20), and 
the way to a long and safe life (21–26) 
a warning to avoid unneighborliness (27–30) and emulating the wicked (31–35).

Trust in God (3:1–12)
It is related to 'loyalty and faithfulness', which can refer to (and may be intended about both) relationships between human and God (cf. Jeremiah 2:2; Hosea 6:4) or human to human (cf. Psalm 109:16; Hosea 4:1; Micah 6:8), and are to be 'worn as an adornment around the neck' (cf. Proverbs 1:9; Deuteronomy 6:8; 11:18) as well as 'written on the heart' (cf. Jeremiah 31:33). As the kernel of the instructions in this chapter, 'trust in God' is contrasted in verses 5 and 6 with self-reliance, that the best action is the complete commitment and submission to God ('all your ways'). The analogy of medicinal healing benefits of wisdom (verse 8) recurs in Proverbs 15:30; 16:24; 17:22), although sometimes tastes bitter (suffering adversity), it is a divine chastisement and a proof of God's fatherly love (cf. Job 5:17–18; 33:14–30; Hebrews 12:5–6).

Verse 1
My son, do not forget my teaching,
but let your heart keep my commandments;
"Teaching": from Hebrew root torah, "guidance, direction" (cf. Proverbs 1:9), paralleling 'commandments', from Hebrew root mitzvah; both terms may refer to "the law of God" although here is applied in wisdom instruction (cf. 'my teaching').

Verse 2
 My teaching will give you a long and prosperous life.

Verses 5–6
Trust in the Lord with all your heart,
and do not lean on your own understanding.
 In all your ways acknowledge him,
and he will make straight your paths.
"Trust": from Hebrew root , related to the words rendered 'securely' in Proverbs 3:23 (cf. Proverbs 1:33) and 'confidence' in Proverbs 14:26; in the Hebrew Bible is used in (1) literal physical sense (physically lean on something for support) and (2) figurative sense (rely on something/someone for help or protection), often in the negative context of false securities, trusting in worthless things, but here in the context of security the Lord who is a 'reliable object of confidence'.

Commendation of Wisdom (3:13–35)
Verses 13–18 form a hymnic celebration of the 'happiness' in finding wisdom, as if possessing a vastly valuable asset, unfailingly pays a higher dividend than silver or gold (verse 14), and beyond comparison is a rare and priceless treasure (verse 15), providing a good quality of long life, riches, and honor (verse 16) and leading to pleasant and peaceful paths (verse 17), metaphorically like 'the tree of life' in the garden of Eden (Genesis 2–3 as the vital source for nourishing growth and promoting fullness of life (cf. Proverbs 11:30; 13:12; 15:4). By Wisdom the world was created and is sustained (cf. ), as Wisdom can 'fructify' life. Those who hold fast to Wisdom and trust in God (verses 21–26; cf. verses 5–8) will have secure and tranquil lives. The application is by inculcating kindness and neighbourliness, while avoiding malicious actions and unnecessary confrontations (verses 27–30. Verses 31–35 warn against envying evil men and imitating their ways, because God's judgement ('curse', cf. Deuteronomy 27:15–26) remains on their house, that they are unable to enjoy the divine blessing as the upright persons, and will be utterly disgraced.

Uses
The milkshake cups' bottom of In-N-Out Burger has the text "PROVERBS 3:5", which refers to the 5th verse of this chapter.

See also

Related Bible parts: Psalm 5,  Proverbs 1, Proverbs 2, Proverbs 5, Proverbs 7, Proverbs 23

References

Sources

External links
 Jewish translations:
 Mishlei - Proverbs - Chapter 3 (Judaica Press) translation [with Rashi's commentary] at Chabad.org
 Christian translations:
 Online Bible at GospelHall.org (ESV, KJV, Darby, American Standard Version, Bible in Basic English)
 Book of Proverbs Chapter 3 King James Version
  Various versions

03